The division of Fraser was one of the two electorates of the unicameral Australian Capital Territory House of Assembly. It elected 9 members in 1975 and 1979, and 8 members in 1982.
It was named for Jim Fraser, who was the Member for Australian Capital Territory from 1951 to 1970. It encompassed the northern suburbs of Canberra, including the districts of Belconnen, Gungahlin, North Canberra and also the Jervis Bay Territory.

Members

References

History of the Australian Capital Territory
Parliament of the Australian Capital Territory
1975 establishments in Australia
1986 disestablishments in Australia
Fraser